The Leader of His Majesty's Opposition in Victoria is the leader of the largest political party in parliament but not in government. They are always a member of the Legislative Assembly. The office is currently held by John Pesutto after his election to the position of leader of the Liberal Party.

List of leaders of the opposition in Victoria

This is an incomplete list of leaders of the opposition in Victoria.

References

Victoria
 
Opposition